Robert Morris (born 31 August 1940) is a British former actor.

His film credits include the 1967 Hammer films Frankenstein Created Woman and Quatermass and the Pit.

Television credits include: The Avengers, The Saint, Z-Cars, Dixon of Dock Green, The Guardians, Thriller, Warship, Blake's 7 and Kessler.

External links
 

British male film actors
British male television actors
1940 births
Living people